Major-General Pierre Bonnemains, Baron of Bonnemains (13 September 1773 in Tréauville –  9 November  1850 in Mesnil-Garnier, was a French officer during the Napoleonic Wars and a member of the French Parliament.

Bonnemains' name is inscribed on the southern pillar of the Arc de Triomphe in Paris.

Notes

References
 

1773 births
1850 deaths
Names inscribed under the Arc de Triomphe
People from Trouville-sur-Mer